Zinzolin or gingeolin, is an old or literary color name that once meant a dark red, and today usually means a reddish purple color. It is generally used to describe clothing.

Origin 
The word comes from the Italian zuzzulino and Arabic  djoudjolân "sesame seed" as zizolin (1599, 1617), or the Spanish cinzolino and Italian giuggiolena, hence the term gingeolin, because you can get a stain from this seed. This explanation goes back to Gilles Ménage, who also mentions a Latin derivation of zinzolin from hysiginium, a plant mentioned by Pliny, and its diminutive hysiginolinum. This etymology has not always been popular, since Michel Eugène Chevreul says "Ginjolin (or gingeolin): color of dried jujube fruit (Zizyphus officinalis), formerly known as gingeole". The Italian and French Dictionary of 1663 indeed pairs the Italian giuggiolino (jujube) with Zinzolin. The Littré says "purple dye," without indicating a source.

In 1650 Paul Scarron speaks of it as a color long gone out of fashion, which probably explains the uncertainties as to its meaning.

The word, from the jargon surrounding tapestry, was used in burlesques in the seventeenth century and in the eighteenth century, with a 1769 pamphlet, still known and criticised by Diderot. Antoine de Rivarol used the word for satirical purposes. 
Max Jacob was able to use zinzolin many times in his novel The  Bouchaballe land (1923), without giving any indication of the color or fabric in question, while providing a supremely fanciful etymology.

Color

Red-purple 
Gingeolin, a reddish color, was used in 1635 Zinzolinin 1599 was unambiguously described in ’Harmonie universelle by Marin Mersenne (1636) as the final color of prismatic light on the red end of the spectrum. The Dictionnaire du tapissier (Weaver's Dictionary) defined zizzolin or zinzolin as a purple garance (rose madder), going back to the inventory of Gabrielle d'Estrées.

Sesame-based dye, used in India, gives a reddish-brown color. In 1615, the zinzolin of the livery worn by Concino Concini's men was compared to the color of blood.

Red-orange 
Same list by Antoine Furetière (1701), can only indicate a yellowish orange.

In the 19th century, Michel-Eugène Chevreul undertook a classification, both comparative and with respect to Fraunhofer lines. He categorized ginjolin (or gingeolin), a color of the Instruction générale pour la teinture of 1671 obtained with rose madder and similar to the color of tile, as in red-orange 4 tone 15.

Maybe not yellow, grey, or blue 
In 1765 a new method for making a gingeolin orpiment made it yellower. But this translation from Italian mentions a clear yellow terre or earth, which in no way resembles gingeolin, and also mentions gingeolin de Naples. The work probably rendered giallorino (golden yellow or Naples yellow) wuth gingeolin. This may have been a translation error, since the term gingeolin was already obsolete, or a transcription of a local usage. Dauphiné and Provence were close to and had commercial ties with Italy, and in 1809, the Dictionaire des patois de l'Isère (Dictionary of the Dialects of the Isère) defined zinzolin or gingeolin as a color approaching a clear yellow. The patois of the Isère could have in this way adopted or adapted an Italian usage.

En 1911 a satirical work mentioned "the taste for pale upholstery fabrics, lemon yellows, pistachio greens, zinzolin greys, evanescent pinks", and in 2002 there is a reference to zinzolin blue .

Purple in modern classifications 
In recent color charts, the color zinzolin is a mauve or a purple. The shift in meaning, from purplish-red to reddish-purple then simply purple, took place in the second half of the 19th century, all the more easily because the word zinzolin has a pleasant sound, but remained rare, literary, pretentious and even bizarre. No doubt this should be see in the context of the invention of artificial coloring and the fashion for purples in the 1860s.

Other modern uses
In embroidery thread: zinzolin 1122 or 2704 Zinzolin Purple 
In buildings: T03 Zinzolin
In colored concrete: Zinzolin 271
In nail polish: Pale Zinzolin Purple

Bibliography 
 Monographs
 
 Chapters
 Rémy de Gourmont, Zinzolin , in "Couleurs", 1915 (online)
 Articles

See also
 Garance (pigment)

References 

Shades of red
Shades of violet